Vettiyattil Krishnan Sreeraman (born 6 February 1953) is an Indian actor, writer, TV anchor and social worker.

Personal life and education
He was born into a middle-class family at Cheruvathani village near Kunnamkulam, situated in Thrissur district of Kerala. His father V. C. Krishnan worked in Ceylon as a Hotel Manager while his mother Bhargavi Krishnan was a teacher by profession. Sreeraman is the second son of his parents, following an elder brother named Jayaprakash (b. 1948), and preceding an unnamed younger brother, who died soon after he was born. He had his education from Vaduthala Upper Primary School (Where his mother worked), St. George High School Thozhiyoor, Government Higher Secondary School Kunnamkulam and College of Fine Arts, Thrissur. He is married to Geetha, and has two children - a daughter named Lakshmi, and a son named Harikrishnan.

Career
His acting career started with one of India's greatest filmmaker G. Aravindan in his internationally acclaimed film Thampu (1978). He made his appearance in the mini screen also through "Natarangu" a discussion program in Asianet and then "Natukootam" in Kairali Channel. He is the anchor of 'Sreeramante Veritta Kazhchakal' program in Kairali Channel where he introduces people from different walks of live whose life experiences are a learning for others and influence the thinking of society.
His unique style in writing makes him different from his peers. He acted in many Malayalam movies. On 27 May 2018, Sreeraman's fake obituary was made in social media, and went viral, until Sreeraman himself proved that he was still alive and well.

Filmography

 1978 Thampu
 1984 Akkare
 1985 Kanathaya Penkutti
 1986 Uppu
 1988 Thaala
 1988 Mrithyunjayam .... Raghavan
 1988 Vaishali
 1988 Piravi (as C.V. Sreeraman)
 1988 Moonnam Mura
 1988 Kakkothikkavile Appooppan Thaadikal
 1988 Dhwani
 1989 Peruvannapurathe Visheshangal
 1989 Pandu Pandoru Desathu
 1989 Layanam
 1989 Antharjanam...Bhadran
 1989 V.I.P. ....Johny
 1989 Alicinte Anveshanam
 1989 Oru Vadakkan Veeragatha
 1989 Utharam
 1989 Carnivel
 1990 Raktharakshassu
 1990 Vachanam
 1990 Kattukuthira
 1990 No: 20 Madras Mail
 1991 Bhoomika
 1991 Nayam Vyakthamakkunnu
 1991 Nattuvishesham
 1991 Inspector Balram
 1992 Annu Good Friday
 1992 Sathya Prathijna
 1992 Radhachakram .... Peter
 1992 Swaroopam
 1992 Sargam
 1992 Adharam
 1993 Sarovaram
 1993 Ghoshayathra.... Fakkuruddin Haji 
 1993 Magrib
 1993 Devasuram
 1993 Chamayam
 1993 Bhoomi Geetham .... Central Minister
 1993 Bandhukkal Sathrukkal
 1993 Aayirappara
 1994 Ponthan Mada
 1994 Sudha Madhalam
 1994 Sukrutham
 1994 Pingami
 1994 Vishnu
 1995 Vrudhanmare Sookshikkuka
 1995 Arabia
 1995 Kalyanji Anandji
 1995 Sasinas
 1995 Sphadikam
 1995 Kaatttile Thadi Thevarude Ana
 1995 Aadyathe Kanmani
 1995 Nattuvishesham
 1995 Oru Abhibhashakante Case Diary
 1996 Kaathil Oru Kinnaram- Kareem Bhai
 1996 Hitler
 1997 Oru Yathra Mozhi
 1997 Maanikyakkoodaaram -Balan
 1997 Kadhanayakan
 1997 Gajaraja Manthram
 1997 Journey to Wisdom
 1997 Aaram Thamburan
 1997 Moksham
 1998 Summer in Bethlehem
 1998 Gloria Fernandez From USA
 1998 Sneham
 1998 Meenakshi Kalyanam
 1998 Harikrishnans
 1998 Elavamkodu Desam
 1999 Thachiledathu Chundan
 1999 Pallavur Devanarayanan
 1999 Garshom
 1999 Friends
 1999 Ezhupunna Tharakan
 2000 Ival Droupadi
 2000 Madhuranombarakattu
 2000 Summer Palace
 2000 Swayamvarapanthal
 2000 Shantham
 2000 Mark Antony...Chakappan
 2000 Valliettan
 2000 Narasimham (film)
 2000 Sradha
 2001 Saivar Thirumeni
 2001 Jeevan Masai
 2001 Chitrathoonukal
 2001 Andolanam
 2001 Ravanaprabhu
 2001 One-Man Show
 2002 Yathrakarude Sradhakku
 2002 Abharanacharthu
 2002 Nandanam
 2003 Kilichundan Mampazham
 2003 Mizhirandilum
 2003 Melvilasam Sariyanu
 2003 Malsaram
 2003 Mizhi Randilum
 2003 Ammakilikkoodu
 2004 Vamanapuram Bus Route
 2004 Vajram...... Shankar
 2004 Maampazhakkaalam
 2005 Chandrolsavam
 2005 Bharathchandran I.P.S
 2005 Udayon .... Advocate Sreedharan 
 2005 Nerariyan CBI
 2005 Lokanathan I.A.S
 2005 The Tiger
 2006 Pulijanmam
 2006 Prajapathi .... Gangadhara Menon
 2006 Oruvan
 2006 Classmates
 2006 Rashtram..... Varadarajan
 2006 Vasthavam
 2006 Karutha Pakshikal
 2006 Yes Your Honour
 2007 Big B (film)
 2007 Nagaram... Vaidyar
 2007 Ali Bhai
 2007 Paradesi
 2008 Pachamarathanalil
 2008 Atayalangal
 2008 Madambi
 2008 Vilapangalkkappuram-Salim
 2009 Meghatheertham -Balunarayan's Father
 2009 Sagar Alias Jacky Reloaded
 2009 The Mother Earth
 2010 Sufi Paranja Katha (film)
 2010 De Nova
 2010 Sahasram
 2010 Drona 2010
 2010 Pranchiyettan & the Saint
 2011 1993 Bombay March 12
 2011 Veeraputhran
 2011 Bhaktha Janagalde Sradhakku
 2011 Venicile Vyapari
 2012 Bavuttiyude Namathil
 2012 Ithra Mathram
 2012 Da Thadiya
 2012 Nammukku Parkkan
 2012 Spirit (2012 film)
 2012 Prabhuvinte Makkal
 2012 Ivan Megharoopan-Padmanabha Kuruppu
 2012 Masters
 2012 Simhasanam
 2013 Lisammayude Veedu
 2013 Natholi Oru Cheriya Meenalla
 2014 Munnariyippu
 2015 Amar Akbar Anthony
 2017 Sunday Holiday
 2017 Comrade In America
 2021 Roy
 2021 Kaalchilambu
 2022 Aaraattu
 2022 Pada
 2022 Kaduva

Television career
Serial
Avasthantharangal (Kairali TV)
Kadamattathu Kathanar (TV series) (Asianet)
Krishnakripasagaram (Amrita tv)
Swami Ayyappan (TV series) (Asianet)
Kayamkulam kochunniyude makan(Surya TV)
As host
Sreeramante verittakazhchakal(Kairali TV) - Anchor
Nattarangu (Asianet)
Nattukoottam (Kairali)

Awards
Bahumukha Prathibha -Flowers TV awards 2017 for verittakazhchakal (TV show)

References

External links
 
 V K Sreeraman at MSI

1953 births
Male actors in Malayalam cinema
Indian male film actors
Living people
Male actors from Thrissur
Male actors in Malayalam television
Indian male television actors
20th-century Indian male actors
21st-century Indian male actors